Suad Fileković (born 16 September 1978) is a Slovenian retired professional footballer.

Club career
Fileković played for Olimpija and Maribor in the Slovenian PrvaLiga, Hajduk Split in the Croatian Prva HNL, Ergotelis in the Greek Super League, Mouscron in Belgium, and Krylia Sovetov in the Russian Premier League.
Filekovič initially joined English Football League Championship club Barnsley on a week-long trial before signing a contract on 18 September 2009 until January 2010. He left the club by mutual consent on 23 October 2009. As the contract with Barnsley expired, Fileković eventually returned to his former club Maribor in January 2010, where he stayed until the end of the 2009–10 season. After being without a club since July 2010, he signed for Israeli side Hapoel Ashkelon on 22 January 2011.

International career
Fileković has made 14 appearances for the senior Slovenia national football team between 2002 and 2009.

References

External links
Player profile at NZS 

1978 births
Living people
Footballers from Ljubljana
Slovenian footballers
Association football fullbacks
NK Olimpija Ljubljana (1945–2005) players
NK Maribor players
HNK Hajduk Split players
Ergotelis F.C. players
Royal Excel Mouscron players
PFC Krylia Sovetov Samara players
Barnsley F.C. players
Hapoel Ashkelon F.C. players
NK Železničar Maribor players
Slovenian PrvaLiga players
Croatian Football League players
Super League Greece players
Belgian Pro League players
Russian Premier League players
Israeli Premier League players
Slovenian expatriate footballers
Slovenian expatriate sportspeople in Croatia
Slovenian expatriate sportspeople in Greece
Slovenian expatriate sportspeople in Belgium
Slovenian expatriate sportspeople in Russia
Slovenian expatriate sportspeople in England
Slovenian expatriate sportspeople in Israel
Slovenian expatriate sportspeople in Austria
Expatriate footballers in Croatia
Expatriate footballers in Greece
Expatriate footballers in Belgium
Expatriate footballers in Russia
Expatriate footballers in England
Expatriate footballers in Israel
Expatriate footballers in Austria
Slovenia youth international footballers
Slovenia under-21 international footballers
Slovenia international footballers
2010 FIFA World Cup players
Slovenian people of Bosniak descent